Events from the year 1201 in Ireland.

Incumbent
Lord: John

Events
William de Braose was installed by King John of England as the chief tenant of a very substantial territory encompassing most of the modern County Tipperary
William de Burgh appointed Seneschal of Munster (Royal Governor)

Births

Deaths

References